Grady Franklin "Gray" Tollison (born September 8, 1964) is a Republican member of the Mississippi Senate, representing District 9 since 1996.  In January 2012, Tollison was appointed Chairman of the Senate Education Committee by Lt. Governor Tate Reeves.  From 2004 until 2012, he served as Chairman of the Judiciary, Division “B” Committee under the leadership of Lt. Governor Phil Bryant and Lt. Gov. Amy Tuck. He also serves as a member of the Rules, Finance, Public Health and Welfare, Universities and Colleges, and Wildlife, Fisheries and Parks Committees.

Tollison switched to the Republican Party on November 11, 2011, two days after winning his fifth election as a Democrat in the Mississippi Senate. This occurred only after Mississippi Republicans seized the control of House of Representatives & State Senate for the first time since the 1800s.

Tollison is a graduate of Oxford High School, Rhodes College and the University of Mississippi School of Law.

See also
 List of American politicians who switched parties in office

References

External links
Mississippi State Senate - Gray Tollison official government website
Project Vote Smart - Senator Gray Tollison (MS) profile
Follow the Money - Gray Tollison
2007 2005 2003 1999 campaign contributions
Gray Tollison For Senate Homepage

1964 births
21st-century American politicians
Living people
Mississippi lawyers
Democratic Party Mississippi state senators
Republican Party Mississippi state senators
Presidents pro tempore of the Mississippi State Senate